The St. Philip Neri Cathedral Also Los Teques Cathedral It is the main cathedral of the Catholic Church and headquarters of the Diocese of Los Teques. The cathedral is located at the historic center of the city the city of Los Teques in the Municipality Guaicaipuro, Miranda state in Venezuela, specifically in front of the renowned Plaza Bolivar in Los Teques.

In the eighteenth century it was established as a modest oratory. It was in this place that the first pastor, Manuel Antonio Fernandez Feo, celebrated the first Mass on 17 September 1778. The first church opened solemnly on May 31, 1790.

See also
List of cathedrals in Venezuela
Roman Catholicism in Venezuela
St. Philip Neri

References

Roman Catholic cathedrals in Venezuela
Los Teques
Roman Catholic churches completed in 1790
Buildings and structures in Miranda (state)
18th-century Roman Catholic church buildings in Venezuela